Shen Guoqin (born 18 July 1961) is a Chinese speed skater. She competed at the 1980 Winter Olympics and the 1984 Winter Olympics.

References

External links
 

1961 births
Living people
Chinese female speed skaters
Olympic speed skaters of China
Speed skaters at the 1980 Winter Olympics
Speed skaters at the 1984 Winter Olympics
Sportspeople from Jilin
20th-century Chinese women
21st-century Chinese women